WPCS (89.5 FM, "Rejoice Radio") is a radio station broadcasting a Christian radio format. Licensed to Pensacola, Florida, United States, the station is currently owned by, and is a ministry of, Pensacola Christian College.

WPCS is the flagship station of the Rejoice Broadcast Network, a network of 41 stations that receive, via satellite uplink, the programming of WPCS. The programming of the Rejoice Broadcast Network includes Christian talk and teaching and Christian music.

Translators

External links

PCS (FM)
PCS (FM)
1971 establishments in Florida
Radio stations established in 1971